This is a list of destinations served by German leisure airline LTU during the winter season 2006/2007 before taken over by Air Berlin:

Destinations

References

Lists of airline destinations